The Lamron is the oldest student newspaper of the State University of New York at Geneseo. It was founded in 1922 and focuses on campus news and events, but also includes coverage of Geneseo, New York and the Rochester metropolitan area. It is published weekly on Thursdays, both in print and online.

History
The Lamron was founded in 1922 and distributes to locations throughout campus and locally for free on Thursdays, except during examination and vacation periods. Funding is provided by mandatory student fees and advertising revenue. All content is overseen by student editors and volunteer student staff. The Lamron is printed by Messenger Post Newspapers, Canandaigua, New York.

The newspaper is led by the editor-in-chief; every section of the newspaper is headed by its own respective editor.

References

External links
 The Lamron website
 The Lamron PDFs
 The Lamron on Facebook
 The Lamron on Twitter

1922 establishments in New York (state)
Newspapers published in New York (state)
Student newspapers published in New York (state)
Newspapers established in 1922